KSDY-LD (channel 50) is a low-power television station in San Diego, California, United States, affiliated with the Spanish-language Nuestra Visión network. It is owned and operated by International Communications Network Inc.

KSDY-LD broadcasts four digital streams: Nuestra Visión, Bounce TV, Canal de la Fe, and  TV.

Subchannels
The station's digital channel is multiplexed:

References

External links

SDY-LD
Low-power television stations in the United States
Television channels and stations established in 1999
1999 establishments in California